The Indian Trade Service (ITS) is a civil service  under Group A of the Central Civil Services of the executive branch of the Government of India. It was created as a specialized cadre to handle India's international trade & commerce on the basis of the recommendations of the Mathur Committee (Study Team on the Import and Export Trade Control Organization headed by Sri H.C. Mathur, Member of Parliament) in 1965.
At present Directorate General of Foreign Trade (DGFT), under Ministry of Commerce, is the cadre controlling authority of the ITS. DGFT has 38 regional offices across India, and plays a significant role in promoting India's international trade with its policy formulation and implementation.

The Department of commerce is headed by a Secretary who is assisted by a Special Secretary & Financial Adviser, three Additional Secretaries, thirteen Joint Secretaries and Joint Secretary level officers and a number of other senior officers. Keeping in view the large increase in workload in matters related to World Trade Organization (WTO), Regional Trade Agreements (RTAs), free trade agreements (FTAs), Special Economic Zones (SEZs), joint study groups (JSGs) etc., two posts each of Joint Secretaries and Directors were created in the department during 2008–09.

The department is functionally organized into the following nine Divisions:

 International Trade Policy Division
 Foreign Trade Territorial Division
 Export Products Division
 Export Industries Division
 Export Services Division
 Economic Division
 Administration & General Service Division
 Finance Division
 Supply Division

Recruitment 
The recruitment to Indian Trade Service is through Civil Services examinations conducted by UPSC. In addition, departmental candidates are also promoted as ITS through career progression.

Role of Indian Trade Service
The main role of ITS officers can be divided into five parts: 
 Policy formulation in the area of International trade
 Trade Policy implementation
 Export promotion through various initiatives
 International trade negotiations and commercial diplomacy
 Miscellaneous and allied responsibilities

Policy formulation 
ITS officers contribute to the making of International Trade Policy formulation for India. India's foreign trade policy (FTP) is a five-year policy document, revised midway after two and half years. The current foreign trade policy in effect is the FTP 2015–20. The foreign trade policy of India is a single document that strives to provide a stable and sustainable policy environment for foreign trade in both merchandise and services. It aims to help various sectors of Indian economy to gain global competitiveness.

Indian Trade Service officers are involved in formulation and drafting of the policy. They also provide key inputs from the field offices regarding international trade matters which is subsequently taken up for review while making of the policy.

Apart from making the trade policy for the country, ITS officers also involve themselves in coordinating with various other ministries for taking stands on trade matters at international forums such as World Trade Organisation. For this purpose, there is a WTO cell at the Directorate General of foreign Trade. In addition, coordination for board of trade for inter state and central government consultation in the area of international trade policy formulation is also managed by ITS officers.

There has been a study by Frost and Sullivan recently where it has been recommended that role of ITS officers may be increased further in the area of policy formulation in coming future.

Trade Policy Implementation 
Foreign Trade Policy of India is implemented in the country through 38 field offices of DGFT, commonly known as Regional Authorities (RAs). These field offices are manned and headed by ITS officers who facilitate international trade from India. In addition many Special Economic Zones are also headed by ITS officers. Under current Foreign Trade Policy of India, the gamut of implementation includes: 
 Implementation of export from India schemes - for both merchandise and services exports
 Implementation of Duty nullification schemes for export products
 Implementation of Export promotion capital goods scheme
 Refund schemes for various deemed exports
 Heading committee on quality complaints and trade disputes - to act as arbiter and enforcer of rules in international commercial disputes
 Acting as quasi-judicial authority in cases pertaining to Foreign Trade Development and Regulation Act 1992. 
 Handling miscellaneous matters related to international trade such as issuing licenses for trading in sensitive/nuclear/defense related items

Export promotion thorough various initiatives 
Indian trade service officers are involved in developing entrepreneurs in the area of international trade through various training and development initiatives. The initiatives are popularly known as 'Niryat Bandhu' initiatives which translates into 'Friends of exporters'. It is a part of push by Government of India under various schemes such as 'Skill India' and 'Make in India'. Under Niryat Bandhu scheme, ITS officers undertake various development activities such as:
 Development of training modules - text, videos and presentations
 Live training and interactions with budding entrepreneurs in the area of international trade
 One to One counselling with new entrepreneurs and officers from Indian Trade Service
 Active hand-holding of entrepreneurs from launch of the project until the first export consignment
 Association with various export promotion bodies and state agencies for training and development
 Documenting lessons learnt for future use of new entrepreneurs
In addition, officers in the field level conduct policy level studies for providing inputs for future policy making in the area for export promotion.

International trade and diplomacy 
Conducting trade policy negotiations for India at the multilateral forum of the World Trade Organization. ITS officers, as part of various delegations from department of commerce, and also as part of various negotiation teams, have been representing India at various WTO forums. 
ITS officers are playing a key role in trade negotiations with various countries. They are important part of the negotiation team representing India at various Free Trade Agreements and Preferential Trade Agreements.
ITS officers man positions at select international bodies such as UNESCAP, WTO etc. where they either work for the international organizations or represent the country at such forums.

Miscellaneous and allied responsibilities 
 ITS officers are currently posted in Directorate General of Anti-Dumping as investigating officers for anti-dumping cases. They recommend anti-dumping duties under WTO rules after completing investigations.
 On encadered positions in various ministries such as ministry of external affairs and ministry of agriculture. 
 As development commissioners at various Special Economic Zones of India.
 As directors of foreign trade at ministry of commerce.
 ITS officers in field act as conduit between state government initiatives and central government schemes by acting as local advisors in policy matters.

Career progression and other roles of ITS officers

References

External links
 http://dgft.gov.in
 http://commerce.gov.in
 http://www.indiantradeservice.org

Central Civil Services (India)
Foreign trade of India